The Arunachal Pradesh Legislative Assembly election of 2009 took place in October 2009, concurrently with the assembly elections in Maharashtra and Haryana. The elections were held in the state for all 60 Assembly seats on 2009-10-13. The results were declared on 2009-10-22. Chief Minister Dorjee Khandu's Indian National Congress party came back to power in the state with an increased majority, winning 42 seats in the 60 seat Assembly.

Previous Assembly
In the 2004 Arunachal Pradesh Assembly election, Congress won 34 of the 60 seats and Congress leader Gegong Apang was elected as the Congress Legislative Party and was sworn in as the Chief Minister. Apang had defected from the Bharatiya Janata Party just a few weeks before the election. The BJP won win 9 seats.

However, in April 2007, 29 Congress legislators formally supported a change of leadership in the state Congress. The dissidents also claimed support from 2 NCP, 1 Arunachal Congress and 11 independent legislators. Apang, Arunachal's longest serving chief minister, was forced to step down on 2007-04-09 when the Congress legislators elected Power Minister Dorjee Khandu as the new Congress Legislative Party leader. Khandu was sworn in as the state's seventh Chief Minister by Nagaland Governor K. Sankaranarayanan on 2007-04-10.

In June of the same year, Khandu's Government received further strengthening when 8 out of the 9 BJP MLAs joined Congress, taking the strength of the party to 41.

Background
The tenure of the Arunachal Pradesh Assembly was scheduled to expire on 2009-10-24. So the Election Commission of India announced on 2009-08-31 that the election to the Arunachal Pradesh Assembly would be held in October 2009.

Though Nationalist Congress Party and All India Trinamool Congress were Congress' allies at the Centre, in Arunachal Pradesh, they fought the election against Congress. The BJP was also in the fray in Arunachal, having formed their 1st Government in the North-East after Apang and his supporters had joined the BJP in August 2003.

Schedule

Results

!colspan=8|
|-
! colspan="2" rowspan="2" width="150" |Parties and Coalitions
! colspan="3" | Popular vote
! colspan="3" |Seats
|-
! width="70" | Vote
! width="45" | %
! width ="50"| +/-
! Contested
! Won
!+/-
|-
| style="background-color: " |
|Indian National Congress
|2,89,501
|50.38
|
|60
|42
|
|-
|style="background-color: "|
|Nationalist Congress Party
|1,11,098
|19.33
|
|36
|5
|
|-
|style="background-color: "|
|All India Trinamool Congress
|86,406
|15.04
|
|26
|5
|
|-
|style="background-color: "|
|People's Party of Arunachal
|41,780
|7.27
|
|11
|4
|
|-
| style="background-color:" |
|Bharatiya Janata Party
|29,929
|5.21
|
|18
|3
|
|-
|style="background-color: "|
|Janata Dal (United)
|3,584
|0.62
|
|3
|0
|
|-
|style="background-color:grey"|
|Independents
|12,364
|2.15
|
|3
|1
|
|-
| colspan="8" style="background-color:#E9E9E9"|
|- style="font-weight:bold;"
| align="left" colspan="2"| Total
| 5,74,662
| 100.00
| style="background-color:#E9E9E9"|
| 60
| 100.00
| ±0
|}
Source:

By constituency

Government Formation

The Congress party won 42 of the 60 seats in the Assembly, including 3 uncontested seats - Dorjee Khandu from Mukto, Tsewang Dhondup from Tawang and Jambey Tashi from Lumla. Seasoned Congressman, seven times MLA and former chief minister, Gegong Apang, and his son Omak Apang both lost the elections. While Gegong lost to Nationalist Congress Party, his son was defeated by Bharatiya Janata Party candidate. Without the competition from Gegong, Dorjee Khandu was smoothly elected as the Congress Legislative Party leader on 2009-10-24.

Khandu was sworn in for his 2nd term as the Chief Minister by Governor J.J. Singh at the Darbar Hall of the Itanagar Raj Bhawan on 2009-10-25.

See also
 State Assembly elections in India, 2009

References

State Assembly elections in Arunachal Pradesh
2000s in Arunachal Pradesh
2009 State Assembly elections in India